Palaeotragus ("ancient goat") is a genus of very large, primitive, okapi-like giraffids from the Miocene of Africa and Eurasia.

Palaeotragus primaevus is the older species, being found in early to mid-Miocene strata, while P. germaini is found in Late Miocene strata. P. primaevus is distinguished from P. germaini by the lack of ossicones. It was also the smaller species, being a little under  at the shoulders.

Species
 

The genus consists of the following species:

 Palaeotragus decipiens
 Palaeotragus germaini
 Palaeotragus microdon
 Palaeotragus primaevus
 Palaeotragus quadricornis
 Palaeotragus. rouenii

References

Further reading

External links
 

Miocene mammals of Europe
Prehistoric giraffes
Miocene even-toed ungulates
Miocene genus extinctions
Prehistoric even-toed ungulate genera
Miocene mammals of Asia
Miocene mammals of Africa
Fossil taxa described in 1861